A mudflap is an accessory on wheel wells of a motor vehicle.

Mudflap may also refer to:
Mudflap (Transformers), several fictional robot superhero characters in the Transformers robot superhero franchise.
Mudflap, a version of the Nike Zeus anti-satellite weapon
Mudflap, a tool for detecting dangling pointers

See also
Mudflap girl, an iconic symbol appearing on many vehicle mud flaps
Fender (vehicle), known in the UK as a mudguard
Splash guard (disambiguation)